The Aberdeenshire and Kincardineshire Central by-election was a parliamentary by-election held for the British House of Commons constituency of Aberdeenshire and Kincardineshire Central on 16 April 1919.

Vacancy
The seat had become vacant when the Coalition Conservative Member of Parliament (MP) Alexander Theodore Gordon died on 6 March 1919 aged just 37, from heart failure after suffering from influenza.  He had held the seat only since the 1918 general election.

Political background
According to reports in The Times, popular opinion was swinging against the coalition government of David Lloyd George and Bonar Law and the Independent, Asquithian Liberals were making the most of the government's popularity to revive.

Candidates

Coalition
The Liberal candidate at the 1918 general election, John Henderson, who had been Liberal MP for West Aberdeenshire since 1906  had only lost to Gordon by the narrow margin of 638 votes. Henderson had been expected to be the Liberals' by-election candidate.  In fact, because of Henderson's strong showing at the general election and the traditional strength of the Liberal Party in the area, the Coalition whips were apparently prepared to endorse him for the by-election, giving him the equivalent of coalition coupon which had been offered to authorised candidates at the 1918 general election. Henderson, no doubt eager to return to Parliament, and fully supported by the local Liberal Association, had reportedly made his peace with Freddie Guest, Lloyd George's Chief Whip. However the local Conservatives were not happy with this arrangement and decided to stand their own candidate, Mr L F W Davidson. This situation proved depressing for the Coalition leaders and no 'coupon' was forthcoming for either Henderson or Davidson by the time the by-election writ was moved on 24 March.

Liberal
Henderson further muddied the waters by standing down as Liberal candidate and the local Association turned instead to Major Murdoch McKenzie Wood, a barrister and former Gordon Highlander, who had unsuccessfully fought Ayr Burghs at the 1918 general election. By the time the by-election campaigning was properly under way, the 'coupon', such as it was, had presumably been bestowed on Davidson as he was described in the election literature and the press as the Coalition Unionist or Coalition Conservative candidate.

Labour
The contest was a three-cornered affair, with Joseph F. Duncan, the general secretary of the Scottish Farm Servants' Union, fighting the seat for Labour.

The popularity of the Coalition
Duncan's candidacy was expected to complicate the possible outcome of the election by splitting the anti-Coalition vote. In the event, this turned out to be the case but not by quite enough to deliver the seat to the Coalition candidate and Wood was returned to Parliament with a majority of 186 over Davidson. However the combined Liberal and Labour vote amounted to 63.9% of the poll and was clearly a severe blow to the Coalition, coming so soon after their overwhelming success in the 1918 general election and hard on the heels of other by-election defeats in Hull and Leyton West. As was pointed out in The Times, no Coalition seat could be considered safe given the temper of the electorate at the time and the Coalition coupon which had been a talisman for candidates a few short weeks before was turning into a curse.

Result

Aftermath

See also 
 List of United Kingdom by-elections (1918–1931)
 United Kingdom by-election records

References 
 
 

By-elections to the Parliament of the United Kingdom in Scottish constituencies
Aberdeenshire and Kincardineshire Central by-election
1910s elections in Scotland
Aberdeenshire and Kincardineshire Central by-election
Aberdeenshire and Kincardineshire Central by-election